John Tudor (born 25 June 1946) is an English former footballer who played for Coventry City, Newcastle United, Sheffield United and Stoke City.

Career
Tudor began his football career playing for his local team, Ilkeston Town before turning professional with Coventry City. He scored eight goals in 17 matches in 1966–67 helping the "Sky Blues" win the Second Division title. He was not as prolific for Coventry in the First Division and after scoring just seven more goals he left for Sheffield United. He rediscovered his goalscoring form at Bramall Lane scoring 33 goals in 78 appearances which helped the "Blades" on their way to promotion in 1970–71.

Tudor signed for Newcastle United in January 1971 and he developed a prolific partnership with Malcolm Macdonald. He scored a career best of 24 in 1972–73 helping the "Toon" win the Anglo-Italian Cup, and two Texaco Cups in the mid 1970s. He scored 14 goals in 1973–74 and 18 in 1974–75 before Gordon Lee became manager and Tudor lost his place. He joined Stoke City in September 1976 and made an impressive debut for the "Potters" scoring twice in a 2–1 victory over Ipswich Town at the Victoria Ground. However, he scored just once more in 1976–77 as Stoke suffered relegation. The following year he moved to K.A.A. Gent in Belgium and stayed two years, scoring 16 goals in 40 games for De Buffalos. He became a publican in Derbyshire and Northumberland, before moving to the US, where he was Director of Coaching at Tonka United in Minnesota.

Career statistics
Source:

A.  The "Other" column constitutes appearances and goals in the Anglo-Italian Cup, Anglo-Scottish Cup and Texaco Cup.

Honours
 Coventry City
 Football League Second Division champions: 1966–67

 Newcastle United
 Anglo-Italian Cup winners: 1973
 Texaco Cup winners: 1974, 1975

References

External links
 Sporting Heroes
 Where are they now?
 Interview with John Tudor at icnewcastle.com

1946 births
Living people
People from Ilkeston
Footballers from Derbyshire
English footballers
Ilkeston Town F.C. (1945) players
Coventry City F.C. players
Sheffield United F.C. players
Newcastle United F.C. players
Stoke City F.C. players
K.A.A. Gent players
Gateshead F.C. players
English Football League players
Association football forwards
FA Cup Final players